In the run up to the 2018 Slovenian parliamentary election, various organisations carry out opinion polling to gauge voting intention in Slovenia. Results of such polls are displayed in this article.

The date range for these opinion polls are from the previous general election, held on 13 July 2014, to the present day. The next parliamentary election was held on 3 June 2018.

Pollsters
There are multiple opinion research companies that conduct election polling on a regular basis within Slovenia, generally publishing poll results on a monthly basis:
 Episcenter, published by Planet SiOL.net and Planet TV;
 Mediana, published by the Slovenian television channel POP TV and their respective multimedia web portal 24ur.com;
 Ninamedia, variably published by either POP TV,the public broadcaster RTV SLO and/or the Slovenian daily newspaper Dnevnik;
 Delo Stik, which is the in-house opinion polling organization of the Slovenian daily newspaper Delo;
 Parsifal SC, which conducts opinion polling for the conservative news media enterprise Nova24TV (Parsifal is (like Nova24TV itself) tied to the largest Slovene conservative party, SDS).

Poll results
Poll results are listed in the table in reverse chronological order, showing the most recent first. The highest figure in each survey is displayed in bold, and the background shaded in the leading party's colour. In case of a tie, no figure is shaded.

References

Slovenia
Opinion polling in Slovenia